Beverly or Beverley is a given name and surname. It is derived from an English surname, which was in turn taken from the place name Beverley.

It was at one time a common masculine given name, but is now almost exclusively a feminine name due to the popularity of a 1904 novel, Beverly of Graustark by George Barr McCutcheon.

Notable people with the name include:

Given name
Beverly Adams (born 1945), Canadian-American actress and author
Beverly Allen (born 1945), Australian botanical artist
Beverley Allitt (born 1968), British serial killer of children
Beverley Badenhorst, South African politician
Beverley Bass (born c. 1951), American pilot
Beverly Bayne (1894–1982), American actress
Beverley "Bev" Bevan (born 1944), English rock musician
Beverly Boys (born 1951), Canadian diver
Beverly Briley (1914–1980), mayor of Nashville, Tennessee (1963–1975)
Beverly Caimen (born 1994), stage name Beverly, Filipino pop singer in Japan
Beverley Cochrane Cayley (1898–1928), Canadian lawyer and mountaineer
Beverly Cleary (1916–2021), American children's author
Beverley Cressman, British actress
Beverly M. Emerson, American biochemist
Beverly Baker Fleitz (born 1930), American tennis player
Beverly Thomas Galloway (1863–1938), American plant pathologist
Beverly Garland (1926–2008), American actress
Beverly Garlick (born 1944), Australian architect
Beverley Goddard (born 1956), former British sprinter
Beverley Goodway (1943–2012), British glamour photographer
Beverley Harper (1943–2002), Australian author of novels set in Africa
Beverly Johnson (born 1952), American supermodel
Beverley Knight (born 1973), English soul and R&B singer-songwriter
Beverley Randolph Mason (1834–1910), American educator
Beverly McClellan (1969–2018), American singer, contestant in the first season of the American TV series The Voice
Beverley McLachlin (born 1943), Canadian jurist and 17th Chief Justice of Canada
Beverley Mitchell (born 1981), American actress and country music singer
Beverley Nichols (1898–1983), English author
Beverley Randolph (1754–1797), eighth governor of Virginia
Beverley Shenstone (1906-1979), Canadian aerodynamicist
Beverly Sills (1929–2007), American operatic soprano
Beverly Washburn (born 1943), American actress
Beverly Watkins (1939–2019), American blues guitarist

Surname
Charles Beverly, American baseball player
Charles James Beverley (1788–1868), British Naval surgeon, FRS.
Cliff Beverley (born 1977), former New Zealand Rugby League player
Frankie Beverly (born 1946), American soul/funk singer-songwriter
Gerald Beverly, (born 1993) American basketball player 
Harry Beverley (rugby league, born 1907), rugby league footballer of the 1930s and 1940s
Harry Beverley (rugby league, born 1947), rugby league footballer of the 1970s and 1980s
Hattie Beverly, (1874–1904) African-American school teacher
Henry Roxby Beverley (1790–1863), English actor
James R. Beverley (1894–1967), United States lawyer
Jo Beverley (1947–2016), British novelist
Nick Beverley (born 1947), former Canadian National Hockey League player and head coach
Patrick Beverley (born 1988), American basketball player
Peter Beverley (c. 1668 – 1728), Virginia colonial politician, Speaker of the Virginia House of Burgesses
Robert Beverley Jr. (1673–1722), American historian
Trazana Beverley, American actress
William Beverley (1696–1756), American legislator, civil servant, planter, and landowner

Fictional characters
Beverly Bighead, one of the supporting characters in Rocko's Modern Life
Beverly Crusher, in the television series Star Trek: The Next Generation and related media
Beverly Harris, in the sitcom Roseanne
Beverly Hope, a recurring character in the television series American Horror Story: Cult, played by Adina Porter
Beverly Katz, in the novel Red Dragon and the TV series Hannibal
Beverley Leslie, a recurring character (Karen Walker'''s frenemy) in the sitcom Will and GraceBeverly Mantle, one of the identical twin main characters of the movie Dead Ringers, both played by Jeremy Irons
Beverly Marsh, the only female member of the loser's club in Stephen King's novel It
Beverly Marshall, in the Australian soap opera Neighbours 
Beverly Moss, the central character of Mike Leigh's television play Abigail's PartyBeverly Weston, in the play August: Osage CountyBeverley Carlton, a character in the play The Man Who Came to Dinner, based on Noël Coward
"B", real name Beverly, from Total Drama: Revenge of the IslandBeverly, the owl spirit, from Spiritfarer''

References

Feminine given names
English feminine given names
English-language surnames
English toponymic surnames
Surnames of English origin
Surnames of British Isles origin